Hecelchakán is a city in the Mexican state of Campeche. The city is located some 70 km to the north of the state capital Campeche.  It is the seat of the Hecelchakán Municipality. As of 2010, the city of Hecelchakán had a population of 10,285.

The name comes from the Maya words jeʼelel (rest) and chakʼan (savanna).

It is at an altitude of 10 m above sea level.

Climate

History
The city was founded close to a cenote by inhabitants of the former city of Xkalumkin, between the years 1500 and 1600.  In this city some important historic events took place, such as the battle between Don Francisco de Paula Toro and the federalists, led by Don Felipe Montero, who was defeated.

In 1840, the district of Hecelchakán included the towns of Pomuch, Pocboc, Tenabo, Tepakán, San Antonio Sahcabchén, Dzitbalché, Bécal, Nunkiní, and Calkiní.

Around 1846, the district of Hecelchakán included three parishes: Hecelchakán, Calkiní and Bécal.

On December 7, 1915, when decree no. 51 approved a new law of interior administration, Hecelchakán became one of the eight free municipalities of the new state of Campeche.  That law came into effect on January 1, 1916.

In 1957 Hecelchakán was given city status by Governor of Campeche Alberto Trueba Urbina.

References
 Link to tables of population data from Census of 2005 INEGI: Instituto Nacional de Estadística, Geografía e Informática
 Enciclopedia de los Municipios de México: Encyclopedia for Mexican Municipalities (in Spanish)

External links

Ayuntamiento de Hecelchakán Official website

Populated places in Campeche
Municipality seats in Campeche